Wuding County (Chuxiong Yi script: ,) is under the administration of the Chuxiong Yi Autonomous Prefecture, in the north-central part of Yunnan province, China, bordering Sichuan province to the north. Wuding's county seat is located only 5 km from the seat of Luquan Yi and Miao Autonomous County. It is a centre for titanium production.

History 
Wuding was historically more important, being the center of a Zhou, equivalent to a prefecture-level division. The prefecture was established in 1567. In 1953 the administrative seat of the division moved to Chuxiong.

Administrative divisions
Wuding County has 7 towns, 3 townships and 1 ethnic township. 
7 towns

3 townships
 Tianxin
 Fawo
 Huanzhou
1 ethnic township
 Dongpo Dai

Ethnic groups

Yi
The Wuding County Gazetteer (1990) lists the following Yi subgroups.
Nasu 纳苏 / Black Yi 黑彝
Naluo 纳罗 / Gan Yi 甘彝
Naisu 乃苏 / Red Yi 红彝
Miqie 密切 / Micha 密岔
Luoluo 罗罗 / White Yi 白彝
Sani 撒尼 / Minglang 明郎

Hani
In Wuding County, ethnic Hani are found in the following locations (Wuding County Gazetteer 1990:141).

Chayiyang 扯衣咩村, Ande Township 安得乡, Chadian District 插甸区
Lower Village 下村 and Azhemi 阿者咪村 of Dacun Township 大村乡
Zhong 中村, Xia 下村, Yangliuhe 杨柳河, and Aozi 凹子 of Huaqiao Township 花乔乡
Shedian Village 赊甸村, Laotao Township 老滔乡

According to the Chuxiong Prefecture Gazetteer (1993:411), the Luomian 罗缅, a Hani subgroup, are located in Nigagu 尼嘎古.

Languages
Gao (2017) lists the following languages of Wuding County. Gao (2017) classifies Geipo of Wuding County as closely related to Miqie, and is not the same as the Northern Loloish language Gepo.

Climate

References

External links
Wuding County Official Website

 
County-level divisions of Chuxiong Prefecture